Pablo Renan dos Santos (born 18 March 1992), sometimes known simply as Pablo, is a Brazilian professional footballer who plays as a defender for Saudi Professional League club Al-Raed.

Football career
Born in Tomé-Açu, Pará, Santos began his career at Paysandu  in his native state. He played six national campaigns for the club, between Campeonato Brasileiro Série B and Série C.

On 23 June 2017, he moved to Portuguese club Marítimo, on the recommendation of Raul Silva of the same state. He played 25 total games in his one season on the island of Madeira, and scored in their 3–2 home Primeira Liga win over Vitória de Guimarães on 24 February 2018.

Santos moved to Braga in the same league on 9 July 2018, on a five-year deal. In his first league game on 19 August he scored the opening goal away to Santa Clara as his new team led 3–0 at half-time, but drew the game 3–3.

On 30 January 2020, he joined Russian Premier League club Rubin Kazan on loan with an option to buy. He left Rubin upon the end of his loan term on 23 July 2020.

On 19 August 2020, Santos joined Turkish Süper Lig side Hatayspor on a season-long loan deal.

On 28 August 2021, he moved on loan to Moreirense for the 2021–22 season.

On 25 July 2022, Santos joined Saudi Pro League club Al-Raed.

References

External links
 

1992 births
Living people
Sportspeople from Pará
Brazilian footballers
Paysandu Sport Club players
C.S. Marítimo players
S.C. Braga players
FC Rubin Kazan players
Hatayspor footballers
Moreirense F.C. players
Al-Raed FC players
Primeira Liga players
Russian Premier League players
Süper Lig players
Saudi Professional League players
Brazilian expatriate footballers
Expatriate footballers in Portugal
Brazilian expatriate sportspeople in Portugal
Expatriate footballers in Russia
Brazilian expatriate sportspeople in Russia
Expatriate footballers in Turkey
Brazilian expatriate sportspeople in Turkey
Expatriate footballers in Saudi Arabia
Brazilian expatriate sportspeople in Saudi Arabia
Association football defenders